The Delhi Metropolitan Council was an autonomous administrative division that existed between 1966 and 1990 that administrated the Union Territory of Delhi. The council had 56 elected and 5 nominated members, and was headed by a Chief Executive Councillor.

History
The States Reorganisation Commission, set up in 1953, led to the Constitutional amendment through States Reorganisation Act, 1956, which came into effect on 1 November 1956. This meant that Delhi was no longer a Part-C State and was made a Union Territory under the direct administration of the President of India. Also the Delhi Legislative Assembly and the Council of Ministers were abolished simultaneously. Subsequently, the Delhi Municipal Corporation Act, 1957 was enacted which led to the formation the Municipal Corporation.

Then, in September 1966, with "The Delhi Administration Act, 1966", the assembly was replaced by the Delhi Metropolitan Council with 56 elected and five nominated members with the Lt. Governor of Delhi as its head. The Council however had no legislative powers, only an advisory role in the governance of Delhi. This set up functioned until 1990.

Councils

List of Chairman of Delhi Metropolitan Council

See also
Autonomous administrative divisions of India

References

Government of Delhi
Autonomous regions of India